The Women's 1 km time trial event of the 2015 UCI BMX World Championships was held on 24 July 2015.

Results

Qualification

Super final

References

Women's time trial
UC